Dwayne Benjamin may refer to:

 Dwayne Benjamin (basketball) (born 1993), American professional basketball player
 Dwayne Benjamin (economist) (born 1961), Canadian economist